The 2018 Ceará state election was held on October 7, 2018 as part of the general elections in Brazil. Those from Ceará eligible to vote elected their representatives in the following proportion: 22 federal deputies, 2 senators and 46 state deputies. 

The candidates for the state government were Camilo Santana (PT), General Theophilo (PSDB), Hélio Góis (PSL), Aílton Lopes (PSOL) and Francisco Gonzaga (PSTU). Camilo was reelected in the first round, with 79.96% of the votes, obtaining the highest percentage in history in a gubernatorial election in Ceará, overcoming the 1982 election results where Gonzaga Mota was elected with 70% of the votes in the first direct election since redemocratization.

In the previous election, Camilo Santana from the Workers' Party (PT) defeated Eunício Oliveira from the Brazilian Democratic Movement (MDB) in the second round. Camilo Santana received 53.35% of the votes, while Eunício received 46.65% of the votes.

Electoral system

Gubernatorial election 
In general, the rules for the presidential elections are also applied to the state. The elections have two rounds, if none of the candidates reaches an absolute majority of the valid votes, a second round between the two most voted candidates happens. All candidates with executive positions should resign by April 7, in order to run.

Senatorial election 
According to the planned rotation for the 2018 Senate elections, two seats for each state will be up for grabs for the 8-year term. The two candidates with the most votes are elected and there is no second round for legislative elections. The ticket of every candidate for the Federal Senate of Brazil must nominate at least two alternate candidates for senator, at least one of whom will assume the vacancy if the Incumbent Senator is licensed to take office as a Minister of State or State Secretary or in case of resignation to take office as a President, Governor, Mayor or their respective vices. The alternate senator also assumes the seat in cases of resignation of the Incumbent senator for personal reasons, death or revocation of the term.

Chamber of Deputies and Legislative Assembly elections 
The Chamber of Deputies and the Ceará State Legislative elections are held using open list proportional representation, with seats allocated using the Hare quota.

Candidates

Governor 

Rejected candidacies

On September 4, 2018, the Regional Electoral Court of Ceará (TRE-CE) rejected the Statement of Regularity of Party Acts (SRPA) of the Workers' Cause Party (PCO) due to the absence of a regularly constituted directory in the State. Because of this, the candidacy of Mikaelton Carantino and the other candidates launched by the party in other positions were rejected. At the end of the month, Carantino resigned to his candidacy and announced he was leaving the party.  His name, however, was included in the DRE voting machine.

Senator 

Rejected candidacies

On August 27, 2018, the Regional Electoral Court of Ceará (TRE-CE) rejected the candidacy of José Alberto Bardawil on the grounds that "the applicant was not chosen at a convention and presented only one candidate as an alternate senator", in this case, his own brother Walter Bardawil. The party he was affiliated with, Podemos (PODE), had already launched Eunício Oliveira in a majority coalition with the Brazilian Democratic Movement (MDB). Subsequently, Bardawil announces his resignation from the candidacy. Like the candidate for governor by the Workers' Cause Party (PCO), Mikaelton Carantino, the candidacy of Alexandre Barroso was also rejected by the TRE-CE. Despite the rejections, the names of Barroso and Burns were included in the DRE voting machine.

Results

Government of Ceará

Federal Senate

Notes

See also 

 Brazilian general elections, 2018
 2014 Ceará gubernatorial election
 Elections in Brazil

References 

Ceará gubernatorial elections
October 2018 events in South America
2018 Brazilian gubernatorial elections